Rashid Hanif is a Twenty20 cricketer from Bangladesh. He was born in Sylhet and made his Twenty20 debut for Sultans of Sylhet in the 2010 season. He debuted 9 January 2004.

References

Bangladeshi cricketers
Sylhet Division cricketers
Living people
Year of birth missing (living people)